Building-integrated photovoltaics (BIPV) are photovoltaic materials that are used to replace conventional building materials in parts of the building envelope such as the roof, skylights, or facades. They are increasingly being incorporated into the construction of new buildings as a principal or ancillary source of electrical power, although existing buildings may be retrofitted with similar technology. The advantage of integrated photovoltaics over more common non-integrated systems is that the initial cost can be offset by reducing the amount spent on building materials and labor that would normally be used to construct the part of the building that the BIPV modules replace. In addition, BIPV allows for more widespread solar adoption when the building's aesthetics matter and traditional rack-mounted solar panels would disrupt the intended look of the building.

The term building-applied photovoltaics (BAPV) is sometimes used to refer to photovoltaics that are a retrofit – integrated into the building after construction is complete. Most building-integrated installations are actually BAPV. Some manufacturers and builders differentiate new construction BIPV from BAPV.

History 
PV applications for buildings began appearing in the 1970s. Aluminum-framed photovoltaic modules were connected to, or mounted on, buildings that were usually in remote areas without access to an electric power grid. In the 1980s photovoltaic module add-ons to roofs began being demonstrated. These PV systems were usually installed on utility-grid-connected buildings in areas with centralized power stations. In the 1990s BIPV construction products specially designed to be integrated into a building envelope became commercially available. A 1998 doctoral thesis by Patrina Eiffert, entitled An Economic Assessment of BIPV, hypothesized that one day there would an economic value for trading Renewable Energy Credits (RECs). A 2011 economic assessment and brief overview of the history of BIPV by the U.S. National Renewable Energy Laboratory suggests that there may be significant technical challenges to overcome before the installed cost of BIPV is competitive with photovoltaic panels. However, there is a growing consensus that through their widespread commercialization, BIPV systems will become the backbone of the zero energy building (ZEB) European target for 2020. Despite technical promise, social barriers to widespread use have also been identified, such as the conservative culture of the building industry and integration with high-density urban design. These authors suggest enabling long-term use likely depends on effective public policy decisions as much as the technological development.

Forms 

The majority of BIPV products use one of two technologies: Crystalline Solar Cells (c-SI) or Thin-Film Solar Cells. C-SI technologies comprise wafers of single-cell crystalline silicon which generally operate at a higher efficiency that Thin-Film cells but are more expensive to produce. The applications of these two technologies can be categorized by five main types of BIPV products:

 Standard in-roof systems. These generally take the form of applicable strips of photovoltaic cells.
 Semi-transparent systems. These products are typically used in greenhouse or cold-weather applications where solar energy must simultaneously be captured and allowed into the building.
 Cladding systems. There are a broad range of these systems; their commonality being their vertical application on a building facade.
 Solar Tiles and Shingles. These are the most common BIPV systems as they can easily be swapped out for conventional shingle roof finishes. 
 Flexible Laminates. Commonly procured in thin-sheet form, these products can be adhered to a variety of forms, primarily roof forms. 

With the exception of flexible laminates, each of the above categories can utilize either c-SI or Thin-Film technologies, with Thin-Film technologies only being applicable to flexible laminates – this renders Thin-Film BIPV products ideal for advanced design applications that have a kinetic aspect. 

Between the five categories, BIPV products can be applied in a variety of scenarios: pitched roofs, flat roofs, curved roofs, semi-transparent facades, skylights, shading systems, external walls, and curtain walls, with flat roofs and pitched roofs being the most ideal for solar energy capture. The ranges of roofing and shading system BIPV products are most commonly used in residential applications whereas the wall and cladding systems are most commonly used in commercial settings. Overall, roofing BIPV systems currently have more of the market share and are generally more efficient than facade and cladding BIPV systems due to their orientation to the sun.

Building-integrated photovoltaic modules are available in several forms:

 Flat roofs
The most widely installed to date is an amorphous thin film solar cell integrated to a flexible polymer module which has been attached to the roofing membrane using an adhesive sheet between the solar module backsheet and the roofing membrane. Copper Indium Gallium Selenide (CIGS) technology is now able to deliver cell efficiency of 17% as produced by a US-based company and comparable building-integrated module efficiencies in TPO single ply membranes by the fusion of these cells by a UK-based company.
 Pitched roofs
Solar roof tiles are (ceramic) roof tiles with integrated solar modules. The ceramic solar roof tile is developed and patented by a Dutch company in 2013.
Modules shaped like multiple roof tiles.
Solar shingles are modules designed to look and act like regular shingles, while incorporating a flexible thin film cell.
It extends normal roof life by protecting insulation and membranes from ultraviolet rays and water degradation. It does this by eliminating condensation because the dew point is kept above the roofing membrane. 

 Metal pitched roofs (both structural and architectural) are now being integrated with PV functionality either by bonding a free-standing flexible module or by heat and vacuum sealing of the CIGS cells directly onto the substrate
Facade
 Facades can be installed on existing buildings, giving old buildings a whole new look. These modules are mounted on the facade of the building, over the existing structure, which can increase the appeal of the building and its resale value.
Glazing
 Photovoltaic windows are (semi)transparent modules that can be used to replace a number of architectural elements commonly made with glass or similar materials, such as windows and skylights. In addition to producing electric energy, these can create further energy savings due to superior thermal insulation properties and solar radiation control.
 Photovoltaic Stained Glass: The integration of energy harvesting technologies into homes and commercial buildings has opened up additional areas of research which place greater considerations on the end product's overall aesthetics.  While the goal is still to maintain high levels of efficiency, new developments in photovoltaic windows also aim to offer consumers optimal levels of glass transparency and/or the opportunity to select from a range of colors. Different colored 'stained glass' solar panels can be optimally designed to absorb specific ranges of wavelengths from the broader spectrum.  Colored photovoltaic glass has been successfully developed using semi transparent, perovskite, and dye sensitized solar cells. 
 Plasmonic solar cells that absorb and reflect colored light have been created with Fabry-Pérot etalon technology.  These cells are composed of "two parallel reflecting metal films and a dielectric cavity film between them." The two electrodes are made from Ag and the cavity between them is Sb2O3 based.  Modifying the thickness and refractance of the dielectric cavity changes which wavelength will be most optimally absorbed.  Matching the color of the absorption layer glass to the specific portion of the spectrum that the cell's thickness and refractance index is best tuned to transmit both enhances the aesthetic of the cell by intensifying its color and helps to minimize photocurrent losses.  34.7% and 24.6% transmittance was achieved in red and blue light devices respectively.  Blue devices can convert 13.3% of light absorbed into power, making it the most efficient across all colored devices developed and tested. 
 Perovskite solar cell technology can be tuned to red, green and blue by changing the metallic nanowire thickness to 8, 20 and 45 nm respectively. Maximum power efficiencies of 10.12%, 8.17% and 7.72% were achieved by matching glass reflectance  to the wavelength that the specific cell is designed to most optimally transmit.  
 Dye-sensitized solar cells employ liquid electrolytes to capture light and convert it into usable energy; this is achieved in a similar way to how natural pigments facilitate photosynthesis in plants.  While chlorophyll is the specific pigment responsible for producing the green color in leaves, other dyes found in nature such as, carotenoid and anthocyanin, produce variations of orange and purples dyes.  Researchers from the University of Concepcion have proved the viability of dye sensitized colored solar cells that both appear and selectively absorb specific wavelengths of light.  This low cost solution uses extracting natural pigments from maqui fruit, black myrtle and spinach as sensitizers.  These natural sensitizers are then placed between two layers of transparent glass.  While the efficiency levels of these particularly low cost cells remains unclear, past research in organic dye cells have been able to achieve a "high power conversion efficiency of 9.8%."

Transparent and translucent photovoltaics 
Transparent solar panels use a tin oxide coating on the inner surface of the glass panes to conduct current out of the cell. The cell contains titanium oxide that is coated with a photoelectric dye.

Most conventional solar cells use visible and infrared light to generate electricity. In contrast, the innovative new solar cell also uses ultraviolet radiation. Used to replace conventional window glass, or placed over the glass, the installation surface area could be large, leading to potential uses that take advantage of the combined functions of power generation, lighting and temperature control.

Another name for transparent photovoltaics is "translucent photovoltaics" (they transmit half the light that falls on them). Similar to inorganic photovoltaics, organic photovoltaics are also capable of being translucent.

Types of transparent and translucent photovoltaics

Non-wavelength-selective 
Some non-wavelength-selective photovoltaics achieve semi-transparency by spatial segmentation of opaque solar cells. This method uses any type of opaque photovoltaic cell and spaces several small cells out on a transparent substrate. Spacing them out in this way reduces power conversion efficiencies dramatically while increasing transmission.

Another branch of non-wavelength-selective photovoltaics utilize visibly absorbing thin-film semi-conductors with small thicknesses or large enough band gaps that allow light to pass through. This results in semi-transparent photovoltaics with a similar direct trade off between efficiency and transmission as spatially segmented opaque solar cells.

Wavelength-selective 
Wavelength-selective photovoltaics achieve transparency by utilizing materials that only absorb UV and/or NIR light and were first demonstrated in 2011. Despite their higher transmissions, lower power conversion efficiencies have resulted due to a variety of challenges. These include small exciton diffusion lengths, scaling of transparent electrodes without jeopardizing efficiency, and general lifetime due to the volatility of organic materials used in TPVs in general.

Innovations in transparent and translucent photovoltaics 
Early attempts at developing non-wavelength-selective semi-transparent organic photovoltaics using very thin active layers that absorbed in the visible spectrum were only able to achieve efficiencies below 1%. However in 2011, transparent organic photovoltaics that utilized an organic chloroaluminum phthalocyanine (ClAlPc) donor and a fullerene acceptor exhibited absorption in the ultraviolet and near-infrared (NIR) spectrum with efficiencies around 1.3% and visible light transmission of over 65%. In 2017, MIT researchers developed a process to successfully deposit transparent graphene electrodes onto organic solar cells resulting in a 61% transmission of visible light and improved efficiencies ranging from 2.8%-4.1%.

Perovskite solar cells, popular due to their promise as next-generation photovoltaics with efficiencies over 25%, have also shown promise as translucent photovoltaics. In 2015, a semitransparent perovskite solar cell using a methylammonium lead triiodide perovskite and a silver nanowire mesh top electrode demonstrated 79% transmission at an 800 nm wavelength and efficiencies at around 12.7%.

Government subsidies 

In some countries, additional incentives, or subsidies, are offered for building-integrated photovoltaics in addition to the existing feed-in tariffs for stand-alone solar systems. Since July 2006 France offered the highest incentive for BIPV, equal to an extra premium of EUR 0.25/kWh paid in addition to the 30 Euro cents for PV systems. These incentives are offered in the form of a rate paid for electricity fed to the grid.

European Union 
 France €0.25/kWh
 Germany €0.05/kWh facade bonus expired in 2009
 Italy €0.04–€0.09/kWh
 United Kingdom 4.18 p/kWh
 Spain, compared with a non- building installation that receives €0.28/kWh (RD 1578/2008):
 ≤20 kW: €0.34/kWh
 >20 kW: €0.31/kWh

United States 
 USA – Varies by state. Check Database of State Incentives for Renewables & Efficiency for more details.

China 
Further to the announcement of a subsidy program for BIPV projects in March 2009 offering RMB20 per watt for BIPV systems and RMB15/watt for rooftop systems, the Chinese government recently unveiled a photovoltaic energy subsidy program "the Golden Sun Demonstration Project". The subsidy program aims at supporting the development of photovoltaic electricity generation ventures and the commercialization of PV technology. The Ministry of Finance, the Ministry of Science and Technology and the National Energy Bureau have jointly announced the details of the program in July 2009. Qualified on-grid photovoltaic electricity generation projects including rooftop, BIPV, and ground mounted systems are entitled to receive a subsidy equal to 50% of the total investment of each project, including associated transmission infrastructure. Qualified off-grid independent projects in remote areas will be eligible for subsidies of up to 70% of the total investment. In mid November, China's finance ministry has selected 294 projects totaling 642 megawatts that come to roughly RMB 20 billion ($3 billion) in costs for its subsidy plan to dramatically boost the country's solar energy production.

Other integrated photovoltaics 
Vehicle-integrated photovoltaics (ViPV) are similar for vehicles. Solar cells could be embedded into panels exposed to sunlight such as the hood, roof and possibly the trunk depending on a car's design.

Challenges

Performance 
Because BIPV systems generate on-site power and are integrated into the building envelope, the system’s output power and thermal properties are the two primary performance indicators. Conventional BIPV systems have a lower heat dissipation capability than rack-mounted PV, which results in BIPV modules experiencing higher operating temperatures. Higher temperatures may degrade the module's semiconducting material, decreasing the output efficiency and precipitating early failure. In addition, the efficiency of BIPV systems is sensitive to weather conditions, and the use of inappropriate BIPV systems may also reduce their energy output efficiency. In terms of thermal performance, BIPV windows can reduce the cooling load compared to conventional clear glass windows, but may increase the heating load of the building.

Cost 
The high upfront investment in BIPV systems is one of the biggest barriers to implementation.  In addition to the upfront cost of purchasing BIPV components, the highly integrated nature of BIPV systems increases the complexity of the building design, which in turn leads to increased design and construction costs.   Also, insufficient and inexperienced practitioners lead to higher employment costs incurred in the development of BIPV projects.

Policy & Regulation 
Although many countries have support policies for PV, most do not have additional benefits for BIPV systems. And typically, BIPV systems need to comply with building and PV industry standards, which places higher demands on implementing BIPV systems. In addition, government policies of lower conventional energy prices will lead to lower BIPV system benefits, which is particularly evident in countries where the price of conventional electricity is very low or subsidized by governments, such as in GCC countries.

Public Understanding 
Studies show that public awareness of BIPV is limited and the cost is generally considered too high. Deepening public understanding of BIPV through various public channels (e.g., policy, community engagement, and demonstration buildings) is likely to be beneficial to its long-term development.

See also 

 Distributed generation
 Microgeneration
 Nanoinverter
 Perovskite solar cell
 Solar panel
 Rooftop solar power
 Roof tile
 Smart glass, a type of window blind capable of conserving energy for cooling
 Solar cell
 Solar power
 Solar thermal
 Zero-energy building

References

Further reading

External links 
 Building integrated photovoltaics an overview of the existing products and their fields of application
 Canadian Solar Buildings Research Network
 Building Integrated Photovoltaics
 EURAC Research Building Integrated Photovoltaic on-line platform
 PV UP-SCALE, a European founded project (contract EIE/05/171/SI2.420208) related to the large-scale implementation of photovoltaics (PV) in European cities.

Applications of photovoltaics
Building materials